Shahany Lagoon is a salty lagoon on the Black Sea coast of Ukraine in Tatarbunary Raion of Odessa Oblast. The lagoon is in the complex of Tuzly Lagoons, connected with the Alibey Lagoon. The area of the water body is 70 km2, salinity is about 30‰. The lagoon is separated from the Black Sea by a sandbar.

Etymology

History

Flora and fauna

References 
 Енциклопедія українознавства. У 10-х т. / Гол. ред. Володимир Кубійович. — Париж; Нью-Йорк: Молоде Життя, 1954–1989.

Tuzly Lagoons